Carbacanthographis amazonica is a species of corticolous (bark-dwelling) lichen in the family Graphidaceae. Found in the Amazon region of South America, it was formally described as a new species in 2022 by Shirley Cunha Feuerstein and Robert Lücking. It has also been recorded in Colombia and Suriname. The lichen has an uneven, greenish to greenish-yellow thallus that lacks a cortex, and has a black prothallus. The specific epithet refers to its distribution in the Amazon region of South America.

References

amazonica
Lichen species
Lichens described in 2022
Taxa named by Robert Lücking
Lichens of South America